Poles in Spain or Polish-Spaniards are citizens and/or residents of Spain whose ethnic origins lie fully or partially in Poland.

Demographics
The Polish minority in Spain numbered approximately 69,353 according to 2014 census figures. The Polish population is mainly guest workers drawn by Spain's economic boom during the 1990s. Madrid, Barcelona, Málaga, Huelva and Valencia have significant Polish populations. The Polish minority in Spain is relatively young, 74% are between 20 and 49 years old.

Poles in the Spanish Civil War

Approximately 5,400 volunteers of Polish origin participated in the Spanish Civil War as part of the International Brigades.
The majority (3,800) were miners working in France, 300 were Polish-Americans, and several hundred were Poles living in various European countries. Only 800 came from Poland itself.

Notable people
 Luis José Sartorius, 1st Count of San Luis, noble, politician and journalist
 László Kubala, former football player
 Enrique Múgica Herzog, politician
 Maria Amalia of Saxony, queen consort of Spain, queen consort of Naples and Sicily
 Adam Karol Czartoryski, aristocrat
 Esther Koplowitz, businesswoman magnate and philanthropist
 Alicia Koplowitz, businesswoman magnate
 Tamara Czartoryska, sportswoman and model
 Adam Jezierski, actor

See also
 Poland
 Poland–Spain relations
 Great Emigration
 Polish diaspora
 Masurians
 Silesians

External links
  - Polonia en España / Polacy w Hiszpanii / Poland in Spain
  - Asociaciones polacas en España / Polskie stowarzyszenia w Hiszpanii

References

Spain
Ethnic groups in Spain
 
Poland–Spain relations